Mays Hill  is a suburb of Sydney, in the state of New South Wales, Australia. Mays Hill is located 24 kilometres west of the Sydney central business district, in the local government areas of the Cumberland Council and City of Parramatta, and is part of the Greater Western Sydney region.

Mays Hill has a stop on the T-80 T-Way bus service. It is also served by several Hillsbus bus routes.

History
Originally some of the lands that is now Mays Hill was part of the governor's domain. This was subdivided and Thomas May was one of the purchasers.

Demographics
The most common ancestries were English 13.2%, Australian 11.1%, Chinese 10.4%, Lebanese 9.9% and Indian 9.4%.
The most common countries of birth were India 8.8%, China (excludes SARs and Taiwan) 6.6%, Lebanon 4.2%, Afghanistan 3.5% and Sri Lanka 3.2%.
Common responses for language included Arabic 8.4%, Mandarin 5.7%, Tamil 4.9%, Gujarati 4.2% and Cantonese 4.1%.
The most common religions were Catholic 30.5%, No Religion 13.4%, Hinduism 12.8%, Islam 7.4% and Anglican 7.1%.

Mays Hill Cemetery 

Mays Hill Cemetery is one of four historic cemeteries in the City of Parramatta local government area and contains the graves of many well known local pioneering families including the Paytens, Fullagars, Houisons, Downs, Ardills and Mustons.  This cemetery was originally known as Western Road Cemetery as it is located on the Great Western Highway.

References

External links 
 Web page of Friends of Mays Hill Cemetery

Suburbs of Sydney
Cumberland Council, New South Wales